Styphelia longifolia, commonly known as long-leaf styphelia, is a shrub species that is native to the Sydney region in Australia. It is shrub that grows to up to two metres in height. The flowers, which appear between March and August in the species native range, are a greenish white to yellow. This is one of the many plants first published by Robert Brown with the type known as "(J.) v.v." appearing in his Prodromus Florae Novae Hollandiae et Insulae Van Diemen in 1810.

References

longifolia
Flora of New South Wales
Plants described in 1810